Duncan Ritchie (17 February 1886 – 21 February 1968) was a Scottish footballer who played as an outside right for Hibernian, Dumbarton, Raith Rovers, Sheffield United and Derby County, bookended by spells at non-league hometown club Renton.

Having been part of Renton's surprise run in the 1906–07 Scottish Cup alongside his cousin, the veteran international John L. Ritchie, as well as Paddy Travers (beating St Bernard's then Dundee before going out to Queen's Park in the quarter-finals), he signed for Hibs and won the minor East of Scotland Shield in 1908 but fell out of favour and spent two seasons on loan at lower-division Dumbarton.

His most productive spell was with Raith, which led him to be considered for an international cap – he played and scored in the 1912 Home Scots v Anglo-Scots trial match – and brought him to the attention of English clubs, though after moving south of the border he made little impact in two Football League seasons. He served with the Black Watch during World War I and was wounded in France in 1915.

References

Scottish footballers
Footballers from West Dunbartonshire
1886 births
1968 deaths
Association football outside forwards
Scottish Football League players
English Football League players
Hibernian F.C. players
Raith Rovers F.C. players
Sheffield United F.C. players
Derby County F.C. players
Dumbarton F.C. players
Renton F.C. players
Black Watch soldiers
British Army personnel of World War I
People from Renton, West Dunbartonshire